"The Clemency of the Court" is a short story by Willa Cather. It was first published on 26 October 1893 in The Hesperian.

Title explanation
The title refers to Serge's being in prison for the rest of his life rather than being given the death penalty.

Plot summary
Serge, a man who was brought up by a Russian woman after his mother died, kills the babushka's husband after he kills Serge's dog. Serge is then sent to a borstal. The story ends with the rationale that even though life was tough in Russia, the United States cares for their children no better.

Characters
Serge Povolitchsky, a young man whose Russian mother drowned in a pond
Mrs Sholdi Davis, the Russian woman who cares for Serge
Mr Davis, Sholdi's husband
Matushka, Serge's dog

References

External links
Full Text at the Willa Cather Archive

1893 short stories
Short stories by Willa Cather
Works originally published in the Daily Nebraskan